Lost McLeod Mine is a legend of a lost mine in the Northwest Territories of Canada.  The story has been featured in many books and magazines.  The events in the legend have led to geographic locations in the Northwest Territories being named Headless Valley and Headless Creek located in Nahanni National Park Reserve.  A creek called Sheep Creek was renamed McCleod Creek  in honour of the Mcleod Brothers. 20 people have died searching for the mine.

See also

Lost mines
Nahanni National Park Reserve

References

Gold mines in the Northwest Territories
Lost mines
Canadian folklore
Nahanni National Park Reserve